Neil or Neal Smith may refer to:

Sports
Neil Smith (American football) (born 1966), in the NFL
Neil Smith (cricketer, born 1967), English cricketer
Neil Smith (cricketer, born 1949) (1949–2003), English cricketer for Yorkshire and Essex
Neil Smith (footballer) (born 1971), English
Neil Smith (ice hockey) (born 1954), Canadian executive and broadcaster

Music
Neal Smith (drummer) (born 1947), founding member of Alice Cooper
Neil Smith (musician), former bassist in AC/DC and Rose Tattoo

Other
Neil Smith (linguist) (born 1939), British linguist
Neil Smith (geographer) (1954–2012), Scottish-born American professor
Neal Smith (politician) (1920–2021), U.S. representative from Iowa
Neil Smith (writer), Canadian fiction writer
L. Neil Smith (born 1946), American science fiction author and political activist
Neil Smith (politician), member of the Missouri House of Representatives

See also
Neil Smyth (1928–2017), Australian cricketer